Saliba  may refer to:

Saliba language, an indigenous language of Eastern Colombia and Venezuela
Piaroa–Saliban languages
Saliba language (Papua New Guinea)
Saliba (name), including a list of people with the name
Saliba Street, an old main street in Cairo, Egypt

See also

Tutor-Saliba Corporation, an American construction company